Steven J. Burakoff is a cancer specialist and the author of both Therapeutic Immunology (2001) and Graft-Vs.-Host Disease: Immunology, Pathophysiology, and Treatment (1990). He served as Director of The Tisch Cancer Institute at Mount Sinai (2007-2017), which was created in 2007 to focus on translational medicine. He is the Lillian and Henry M. Stratton Professor of Cancer Medicine at Mount Sinai Medical Center as well as Dean for Cancer Innovation and Chief, Pediatric Oncology at the Icahn School of Medicine.

Biography
Before joining Mount Sinai, he was recruited by New York University School of Medicine to revitalize the research and treatment mission of NYU's Cancer Institute, which during his tenure experienced a 31 percent growth and a 50 percent increase in funding from the National Cancer Institute. He completed a residency in medicine at New York Hospital-Cornell Medical Center and pursued fellowships in immunology at both Rockefeller University and Harvard Medical School.

He has received 84 grants as of 2020 in fields related to core administration, cancer, T-Cell activation and regulation, as well as various immunological studies.

His brother, Robert Burakoff, is a gastroenterologist at Brigham and Women's Hospital in Boston, MA.

Awards
1995 Harvard Medical School Excellence in Mentoring Award
2006 Lynne Cohen Foundation Award
 2009 American Association of Immunologists Lifetime Achievement Award 
2019 Elected a Distinguished Fellow of American Association of Immuologists

Appointments and positions
 Director of The Tisch Cancer Institute at Mount Sinai
 Past Director, Skirball Institute of Biomolecular Medicine, New York University School of Medicine
 Board of Directors, Pharmacopeia Drug Discovery, Inc.
Board of Directors, Damon Runyon Cancer Research Foundation

Publications
Burakoff has published 404 articles as of 2020 and has been cited more than 23,000 times according to RearchGate.

Books

 Strom TB, Austen KF, Burakoff SJ. Therapeutic Immunology. Wiley-Blackwell, 2001 
 Ferrara JLM, Deeg HJ, Burakoff SJ. Graft-Vs.-Host Disease: Immunology, Pathophysiology, and Treatment. Marcel Dekker, 1990

Other publications (partial list)

Interleukin-3 (IL-3)-induced c-fos activation is modulated by Gab2-calcineurin interaction. Pyarajan S, Matejovic G, Pratt JC, Baksh S, Burakoff SJ. Journal of Biological Chemistry. 2008 
Lysine 144, a ubiquitin attachment site in HIV-1 Nef, is required for Nef-mediated CD4 down-regulation. Jin YJ, Cai CY, Zhang X, Burakoff SJ. Journal of Immunology 2008 
Prostaglandin E2 activates HPK1 kinase activity via a PKA-dependent pathway. Sawasdikosol S, Pyarajan S, Alzabin S, Matejovic G, Burakoff SJ. Journal of Biological Chemistry, 2007 
From bytes to bedside: data integration and computational biology for translational cancer research. Mathew JP, Taylor BS, Bader GD, Pyarajan S, Antoniotti M, Chinnaiyan AM, Sander C, Burakoff SJ, Mishra B. PLoS Computational Biology, 2007 
A CD8/Lck transgene is able to drive thymocyte differentiation. Fragoso RC, Pyarajan S, Irie HY, Burakoff SJ. Journal of Immunology, 2006 
HIV Nef-mediated CD4 down-regulation is adaptor protein complex 2 dependent. Jin YJ, Cai CY, Zhang X, Zhang HT, Hirst JA, Burakoff SJ. Journal of Immunology, 2005 
CD4 phosphorylation partially reverses Nef down-regulation of CD4. Jin YJ, Zhang X, Boursiquot JG, Burakoff SJ. Journal of Immunology, 2004 
Nicotine activates nuclear factor of activated T cells c2 (NFATc2) and prevents cell cycle entry in T cells. Frazer-Abel AA, Baksh S, Fosmire SP, Willis D, Pierce AM, Meylemans H, Linthicum DS, Burakoff SJ, Coons T, Bellgrau D, Modiano JF. Journal of Pharmacology and Experimental Therapeutics, 2004 
SOD2-deficiency anemia: protein oxidation and altered protein expression reveal targets of damage, stress response, and antioxidant responsiveness. Friedman JS, Lopez MF, Fleming MD, Rivera A, Martin FM, Welsh ML, Boyd A, Doctrow SR, Burakoff SJ. Blood, 2004 
Fratricide of CD8+ cytotoxic T lymphocytes is dependent on cellular activation and perforin-mediated killing. Su MW, Pyarajan S, Chang JH, Yu CL, Jin YJ, Stierhof YD, Walden P, Burakoff SJ. European Journal of Immunology, 2004 
Increasing T-cell age reduces effector activity but preserves proliferative capacity in a murine allogeneic major histocompatibility complex-mismatched bone marrow transplant model. Friedman JS, Alpdogan O, van den Brink MR, Liu C, Hurwitz D, Boyd A, Kupper TS, Burakoff SJ. Journal of the American Society of Blood and Marrow Transplantation, 2004 
Rapamycin-resistant proliferation of CD8+ T cells correlates with p27kip1 down-regulation and bcl-xL induction, and is prevented by an inhibitor of phosphoinositide 3-kinase activity. Slavik JM, Lim DG, Burakoff SJ, Hafler DA., Journal of Biological Chemistry, 2004

References

External links
Mount Sinai Hospital homepage
The Tisch Cancer Institute at Mount Sinai

Albany Medical College alumni
American medical academics
Harvard Medical School alumni
Lehigh University alumni
Living people
Queens College, City University of New York alumni
Place of birth missing (living people)
Year of birth missing (living people)